Personal Album was an Australian television series, which aired on Melbourne station GTV-9 on Tuesdays, from 18 November 1958 to 12 May 1959. Originally the programme ran for 15 minutes, it was later expanded to 30 minutes. The series was hosted by Jack Little, it was an interview series.

People interviewed by Little during the series included Noel Ferrier,  Toni Lamond and Frank Sheldon, Bill McCormack and Happy Hammond.

It should not be confused with Personal Column, a HSV-7 series which also aired from 1958 to 1959.

References

External links

Nine Network original programming
1958 Australian television series debuts
1959 Australian television series endings
Australian television talk shows
Black-and-white Australian television shows
English-language television shows